This paleomammalogy list records new  fossil mammal taxa that were described during the year 2010, as well as notes other significant paleomammalogy discoveries and events which occurred during that year.

Non eutherian mammals

Newly named eutherians

Notes

References 

2010 in paleontology